The Battle of Radzymin was one of a series of engagements between the 1st Byelorussian Front of the Red Army and the Army Group Centre of the German Army. The battle was part of the Lublin-Brest Offensive between 1 and 4 August 1944 at the conclusion of Operation Bagration the Belorussian strategic offensive operation near the town of Radzymin in the vicinity of Warsaw, part of which entailed a large tank battle at Wołomin. It was the largest tank battle on the territories of Poland during the war.

The approach of the Red Army towards Warsaw served to initiate the Warsaw Uprising by the Home Army with expectation of help from the Red Army. The battle ended in a Soviet defeat and the encirclement and destruction of the Soviet 3rd Tank Corps; it is unclear to what extent this defeat contributed to the Soviet decision not to aid the Warsaw Uprising.

Before the battle
After crossing into Poland, the Red Army's 1st Byelorussian Front of Konstantin Rokossovsky continued its advance towards Warsaw. The 65th Army (12 divisions) together with the attached 1st Guards Tank Corps, was to advance towards the town of Serock and then outflank Warsaw from the north. The 28th Army (9  divisions) together with 1st Mechanized and 9th Tank Corps was advancing directly towards Warsaw and was separated from the 47th Army by the Siedlce-Mińsk Mazowiecki line, and from the 65th Army by the Sokołów Podlaski-Węgrów-Radzymin line. Both armies, additionally supported by the 2nd and 4th Guards Cavalry Corps, were destined to take part in repelling a German tactical counter-assault at Radzymin and Wołomin near Warsaw. At the same time, the 47th Army (10 divisions) was to seize the southern approaches to Praga, seize right-bank Warsaw and cross the river through the bridges in Warsaw or through a temporary bridge in Góra Kalwaria. The 70th Army (4 divisions) was to follow the 47th and serve as a tactical reserve.

At the same time the remaining forces of the front were to support the assault on Warsaw by crossing the Vistula south of it, near Magnuszew and outflanking the city from the South and West. The 8th Guards Army (9 divisions) together with the 1st Polish Army (3 divisions) and 69th Army (9 divisions aided by the 11th Tank Corps) were to cross the river at Magnuszew.

Battle
After the Soviet reconnaissance units reached Warsaw in late July, on 1 August 1944 the Warsaw Uprising started. Starting from an area south of Mińsk Mazowiecki, Major General Nikolai Vedeneev's 3rd Tank Corps (part of the Soviet 2nd Tank Army) thrust northwest through Okuniew and Wołomin to Radzymin, reaching an area only three miles (five kilometers) from the strategic bridge over the Narew River at Zegrze.

In response to Vedeneev's thrust, the Germans started a tactical counter-attack near Radzymin on 31 July. The offensive, carried out by 4 understrength Panzer divisions, was to secure the eastern approaches to Warsaw and Vistula crossings, and aimed to destroy the three tank corps of the Second Tank Army in detail. Under the leadership of German Field Marshal Model, the 4th, 19th, Hermann Göring, and 5th SS Panzer Divisions were concentrated from different areas with their arrival in the area of Wołomin occurring between 31 July and 1 August 1944. Although the 3rd Tank Corps gamely defended the initial assaults of the Hermann Göring and 19th Panzer Divisions, the arrival of the 4th Panzer and 5th SS Panzer Divisions spelled doom for the isolated and outnumbered unit.

Already on 1 August, the leading elements of the 19th and 5th SS Panzer Divisions, closing from the west and east respectively, met at Okuniew, cutting the 3rd Tank Corps off from the other units of the Second Tank Army.  Pressed into the area of Wołomin, the 3rd Tank Corps was pocketed and destroyed on 3 August 1944. Attempts to reach the doomed tank corps by the 8th Guards Tank Corps and the 16th Tank Corps failed, with the 8th Guards Tank Corps taking serious losses in the attempt. Although Model had planned to attack the 8th Guards Tank Corps next, the withdrawal of the 19th and Hermann Göring Panzer Divisions to shore up the German defenses around the Magnuszew bridgehead forced the remaining German forces around Okuniew to go on the defensive.

For unknown reasons, on 2 August 1944 all armies that were to assault Warsaw had their orders changed. The 28th, 47th and 65th Armies were ordered to turn northwards and seize the undefended town of Wyszków and the Liwiec river line. The 2nd Tank Army was left in place and had to fight the Germans alone, without support of the infantry. Also, 69th Army was ordered to stop while the 8th Guards Army under Vasily Chuikov was ordered to halt the assault and await a German attack from the direction of Garwolin.

Further combat lasted until 10 August, when the Germans finally withdrew. Soviet losses were heavy, but not heavy enough to affect the overall course of their thrust to the vicinity of Warsaw. The 3rd Tank Corps was destroyed, the 8th Guards Tank Corps took heavy losses, and the 16th Tank Corps took significant losses as well. Overall, the Second Tank Army's losses were significant enough that it was withdrawn from the front lines by 5 August 1944.

Aftermath
Altogether, between 1 and 10 August, the 2nd Tank Army lost 409 killed in action, 1,271 wounded and 589 missing. In addition, it lost 284 tanks and self-propelled guns (40% of these losses were non-recoverable, amounting to 113 armored vehicles lost permanently) out of 679 available to the army on 30 July. After World War II, communist propaganda used the example of the Battle of Radzymin of 1944 as a proof that the German counter-attack prevented the Red Army from helping the Warsaw Uprising. However, it remains unknown why the Soviet assault was halted as some Russian archives are still closed to historians. Some Polish and Western historians argue that the Soviet assault was halted because Stalin wanted the Warsaw insurgents, loyal to the Polish government in exile (known for its anti-Soviet stance), destroyed.

The Soviet command apparently did not blame Lieutenant-General N. D. Vedeneev for the encirclement and destruction of the 3rd Tank Corps.  Vedeneev survived the battle and remained in command. The 3rd Tank Corps was honored by being designated the 9th Guards Tank Corps in November 1944.

Order of Battle, 1st Belorussian Front on 1 August 1944
8th Guards Army
4th Guards Rifle Corps
28th Guards Rifle Corps
29th Guards Rifle Corps
11th Guards Heavy Tank Brigade
28th Army
3rd Guards Rifle Corps
20th Rifle Corps
128th Rifle Corps
22nd Artillery Division
47th Army
77th Rifle Corps
125th Rifle Corps
129th Rifle Corps
60th Rifle Division
48th Army
29th Rifle Corps
42nd Rifle Corps
53rd Rifle Corps
194th Rifle Division
65th Army
18th Rifle Corps
46th Rifle Corps
80th Rifle Corps
105th Rifle Corps
115th Rifle Brigade
26th Artillery Division
69th Army
25th Rifle Corps
61st Rifle Corps
91st Rifle Corps
68th Tank Brigade
70th Army
96th Rifle Corps
114th Rifle Corps
2nd Tank Army
8th Guards Tank Corps
3rd Tank Corps
16th Tank Corps
Polish 1st Army
1st Army Corps
2nd Army Corps
1st Tank Corps
2nd Guards Cavalry Corps
4th Guards Cavalry Corps
7th Guards Cavalry Corps
4th Breakthrough Artillery Corps
1st Guards Tank Corps
1st Mechanized Corps
9th Tank Corps
11th Tank Corps

German units present at the Battle of Wołomin
 73rd Infantry Division (facing Soviet 16th Tank Corps)
 19th Panzer Division (facing Soviet 3rd Tank and 8th Guards Tank Corps)
 Hermann Göring Panzer Division (facing Soviet 3rd Tank Corps)
 4th Panzer Division (facing Soviet 3rd Tank Corps)
 5th SS Panzer Division (facing Soviet 3rd Tank and 125th Rifle Corps)

See also 
 Lead up to the Warsaw Uprising
 Lack of outside support in the Warsaw Uprising
 Operation Bagration

Notes 
In 1941, a massive tank battle  took place in the vicinity of Brody; this area was nominally a part of Poland until border agreements with USSR were signed in 1945. However, the official Polish historiography during the communist period was that the river Bug formed Poland's eastern border and the Polish territories east of it were called "Western Ukraine and Belarus". Nevertheless, the battle of Radzymin remains the largest tank battle on the territory of present-day Poland.
 The 19th PzD had 70 armored fighting vehicles (AFV), meaning tanks, assault guns, and tank destroyers, the Hermann Göring had 63 AFVs, the 5th SS PzD had 66 AFVs, and the 4th PzD had 78 AFVs. Source for this data is Germany and the Second World War, p. 581.
 When Titans Clash, p. 213.
 Germany and the Second World War, pp. 582–583.
 Танковый удар: танковая армия в наступательной операции фронта по опыту Великой Отечественной войны by Радзиевский Алексей Иванович, Map of 2nd Tank Army operations map
 Танковый удар: танковая армия в наступательной операции фронта по опыту Великой Отечественной войны by Радзиевский Алексей Иванович link
 Germany and the Second World War, p. 584, notes that Second Tank Army's strength in tanks and assault guns was 810 on 22 July 1944, and that this had dwindled to 263 armored fighting vehicles by 4 August 1944.

References

Further reading 
Norman Davies, Rising '44. The Battle for Warsaw, Macmillan, 2004,

External links 
 Jan Sidorowicz, Co działo się na wschód od Wisły w czasie Powstania Warszawskiego?, Sep 8, 2004

Battle of Radzymin (1944)
Warsaw Uprising
Operation Bagration
Military operations of World War II involving Germany
Tank battles involving Germany
Tank battles involving the Soviet Union
Battle of Radzymin (1944)
Tank battles of World War II
Encirclements in World War II